Harbhajan Singh E.T.O. is an Indian politician and the MLA from Jandiala Assembly constituency. He is a member of the Aam Aadmi Party. He became an Excise and Taxation Officer (ETO) in 2012 but he took voluntary retirement from the post of ETO in 2017 and he contested election from Jandiala constituency in 2017. He secured 33912 votes in 2017 and was among the highest vote gatherers in Majha region of Punjab in 2017. In 2022 he won from the same constituency with a margin of almost 25000+ votes defeating working president and sitting MLA Sukhwinder Singh Danny Bandala.

Member of Legislative Assembly
Singh was elected as the MLA in the 2022 Punjab Legislative Assembly election.  He represented the Jandiala Assembly constituency in the Punjab Legislative Assembly. The Aam Aadmi Party gained a strong 79% majority in the sixteenth Punjab Legislative Assembly by winning 92 out of 117 seats in the 2022 Punjab Legislative Assembly election. MP Bhagwant Mann was sworn in as Chief Minister on 16 March 2022. He took oath as a cabinet minister along with nine other MLAs on 19 March at Guru Nanak Dev auditorium of Punjab Raj Bhavan in Chandigarh. Eight ministers including Singh who took oath were greenhorn (first term) MLAs.

As a cabinet minister in the Mann ministry, Singh was given the charge of two departments of the Punjab Government:
 Department of Power
 Department of Public Works

Power minister 
Fulfilling their election promise of providing free electricity, from 1 July the people in Punjab would get 300 units of free electricity.  73.39 lakh domestic consumers were estimated to benefit from the scheme.

Electoral performance

References

Living people
Punjab, India MLAs 2022–2027
Aam Aadmi Party politicians from Punjab, India
Mann ministry
Year of birth missing (living people)